The 4th Grand Prix du Salon was a Formula One motor race held on 30 May 1948 at the Autodrome de Linas-Montlhéry, in Montlhéry near Paris.

The 48-lap race was won by Talbot-Lago driver Louis Rosier. Pierre Levegh and Yves Giraud-Cabantous were second and third, also driving Talbot-Lagos. ERA driver Leslie Johnson started from pole but failed to finish, as did B. Bira who set fastest lap in a Maserati.

Results

References

Salon